Dennis Dellwo (born August 31, 1945) is an American politician who served in the Washington House of Representatives from the 3rd district from 1983 to 1996.

On November 6, 2012, Dellwo unsuccessfully ran for Washington House of Representatives for District 6. Dellwo was defeated by Jeff Holy. Dellwo received 45.16% of the votes.

Personal life 
Dellwo's wife is Lynnette Dellwo. They have six children. Dellwo and his family live in Spokane, Washington.

References

External links 
 Dennis Dellwo at ballotpedia.org

1945 births
Living people
Democratic Party members of the Washington House of Representatives
Politicians from Spokane, Washington